The Newaukum River is a tributary of the Chehalis River in the U.S. state of Washington. It has three main branches, the North Fork, South Fork, and Middle Fork Newaukum Rivers.

The river's name comes from the Upper Chehalis word náwaqwəm, meaning "big prairie".

Mainstem
Formed by the confluence of the North and South Forks in Newaukum Prairie, the mainstem Newaukum River flows generally west and north. After , near the city of Chehalis, the Newaukum River empties into the Chehalis River, at Chehalis river mile 75.2.

South Fork
It flows generally west. It exits the mountains and enters broad valleys and prairie lands, flowing by the community of Onalaska. The river turns north in Newaukum Prairie and joins the North Fork to form the mainstem Newaukum River.

North Fork
In Newaukum Prairie it is joined by the Middle Fork Newaukum River. Shortly below the Middle Fork confluence the North Fork joins the South Fork to form the mainstem Newaukum River.

The cities of Chehalis and Centralia divert part of the North Fork's waters for municipal use at river mile 12.5

Middle Fork
It flows southwest into Alpha Prairie. It turns west and flows through hillier terrain before entering the Newaukum Prairie and emptying into the North Fork Newaukum River.

Natural history
The mainstem river and some of its forks and tributaries support both spring and fall Chinook salmon, Coho salmon, and other fish.

See also
 List of rivers of Washington

References

External links

Rivers of Washington (state)
Rivers of Lewis County, Washington